Reunion is a 2018 Bengali film. It was directed by Murari Mohan Rakshit and is the first Bengali movie to be screened in the United Arab Emirates.

Plot 
Four University friends Arko, Abhi, Joyita and Shuvo meet each other after twenty years and trigger old memories, set against the backdrop of the 90s, of friendship, romance and active campus politics. Romita is the eye of the audience as through the process of telling her the stories of their younger days a plethora of repressed responses and crisis ate revealed. Their finding out of their college senior and leader Rudra, played by Parambrata Chatterjee and his crush Monideepa played by Raima Sen brings out lost love.

Cast 
 Rudra- Parambrata Chatterjee
 Monideepa – Raima Sen
 Romita – Anindita Bose
 Ajoy - Anindya Pulak Banerjee
 Abhi – Saurav Das
 Shuvo – Samadarshi Dutta
 Arindam – Subhrajit Dutta
 Joyita – Saayoni Ghosh
 Arko – Indrasish Roy

References 

Bengali-language Indian films
2010s Bengali-language films